Killingbeck is a district of Leeds, West Yorkshire, England.

Killingbeck may also refer to:

Killingbeck Island, an island of Adelaide Island, Antarctica

People with the surname
Molly Killingbeck (born 1959), Jamaican-born Canadian sprinter